National Military Appreciation Month, also known as Military Appreciation Month, is a month-long observance observed in the United States, dedicated to people who are currently in the military or have resigned from duty. Each year, the observance runs from May 1 to May 31.

History
Senator John McCain proposed the month long observance on February 9, 1999. On May 30, 1999, Congress designated National Military Appreciation Month as a month-long observance.  Congress chose May because many military related observances such as Memorial Day and Loyalty Day are celebrated and observed on that date. Congress recognized the month after an unanimous vote of 93-0 in April of that year.

Proclamations 
Since May 1999, almost all of the states have made proclamations about the month, with the first ones being Arizona, Montana, North Carolina, Washington and Michigan.

Digital commemorations
In the 2020s, videogames created virtual events to celebrate and raise funds for Military Appreciation Month.

Discounts and commemorations 

On May 2, 2016 Chevrolet donated $5 million+ worth of cars to the National Navy UDT-SEAL Museum. Multiple companies give discounts to people who currently serve or resigned in the military which include all 6 branches. Some notable companies that give these discounts are Home Depot, Hulu, Lowe's, T-Mobile and Verizon. Some brands only give discounts to veterans on certain days on Military Appreciation Month such as Adidas, Chevrolet, Nike, Chick-fil-A, Ford, Under Armour and IHOP. Many families in the United States thanked the military veterans during the month long observance to show respect. The humanitarian organization known as Red Cross provided more than 15,000 military veteran families during the 2021 Military Appreciation Month to the 2022 Military Appreciation Month. There are also about 50 large companies that give discounts during the month.

Nascar recognized the month during May 2022 through the annual NASCAR Salutes Together with Coca-Cola program. The USS Lexington (CV-16) also known as The Blue Ghost made an exhibit about some of the veterans that fought on it during WW2 which the exhibit stayed for the entirety of May 2021 Military Appreciation Month. Education discounts for military is also noticeable during the month long observance. The USS Missouri was luminated in red, white and blue for the 23rd annual Hawaii Military Appreciation Month opening ceremony. At the California African American Museum, they made an exhibit featuring black soldiers accomplishments in World War 2.

Military Appreciation Day           
Military Appreciation Day is observed on August 31 and has the same idea as the month. Although not as popular as the month, it still is relevant in state fairs. The observation was created in 1949.

See also
List of month-long observances

References

External links
 S.Res.33 — 106th Congress (1999-2000) Official site of the U.S Senate, document that is about the appreciation month.

1999 establishments in the United States
Awareness months
May observances
Month-long observances
Recurring events established in 1999